Jathika Vimukthi Peramuna (JVP; National Liberation Front) was a political party formed in 1957 by the K. M. P. Rajaratne and his wife, Kusuma Rajaratne. The JVP received support from local businesses, and anti-Tamil riots were extreme in villages in which it was active.

Riots
Following the arrangement for talks between Federal Tamils and the government of Ceylon, riots broke out against the country's Tamil population. Several Sinhalese mobs broke into Tamil houses and attacked. The attacks included rape. This violence were higher in the Polonnaruwa district.

Following the riots, the government of Ceylon banned ITAK and the JVP. The bans lasted for several months.

Coalition government
Once the ban on the JVP ended, the JVP contested in democratic elections, and joined the United National Party (UNP). The UNP promised positions to several organisations that were opposed to Marxism.

References

1957 establishments in Ceylon
Anti-communist organizations
Buddhist nationalism
Defunct political parties in Sri Lanka
Political parties established in 1957
Sinhalese nationalist organisations
Sinhalese nationalist parties
Far-right politics in Asia